Acabou Chorare (No More Crying in English) is the second studio album by Brazilian rock and MPB group Novos Baianos. The album was released in 1972 by Som Livre, following the group's moderately successful debut É Ferro na Boneca (1970). During the recording of the album, the group took inspiration from various contemporary artists of the time, such as Jimi Hendrix, João Gilberto, and Assis Valente. In addition, Gilberto heavily influenced the sound of the album, as he served as the group's mentor during the album's recording sessions.

The album was written and recorded as a response to contemporary Brazilian music of the 1970s, which often dealt with melancholic subject matters (due in part to the ongoing military dictatorship of the time period). The album imparts a diverse blend of musical genres and is noted for its creative mixture of samba and rock music.

Decades after release, the album remains one of the most important and influential in the history of popular Brazilian music, being acclaimed by critics and listeners alike. Upon release, the album received extensive airplay on Brazilian radio stations, which had a substantial effect on its popularity and success. Popular Brazilian singers Vanessa da Mata, Marisa Monte, CéU, Roberta Sá, and Mariana Aydar have all cited the album as one of their biggest influences.

In 2007, Acabou Chorare ranked first in Rolling Stone's "The 100 Greatest Albums of Brazilian Music" list, being hailed as a masterpiece by journalists, historians, and musicians alike. In September 2012, it was voted by the audience of Radio Eldorado FM, of Estadao.com e of Caderno C2+Música (both the latter belong to the newspaper O Estado de S. Paulo) as the eighth greatest Brazilian album, tied with Secos & Molhados, by the band of the same name.

Music and lyrics 
Moraes Moreira and Pepeu Gomes served as the arrangers for the record, with Moreira and Brazilian poet Luiz Galvão composing the majority of the record's songs, with contributions from Boca de Cantor and Gomes. The album was written and recorded at Cantinho do Vovô, a property located in Jacarepaguá, where the group members (and their relatives) lived in a communal style, typical of hippies of the time period. It took a total of two years for the group to write, rehearse, and record the record. Recording commenced in 1972, after the group's move to Cantinho do Vovô.

The album's opening track, "Brasil Pandeiro", was suggested by João Gilberto for the group to record. Brazilian composer Assis Valente had originally composed the track for Carmen Miranda, who was returning to Brazil from the United States at the time it was written, which its lyrical content reflects.

"Preta Pretinha" is a six-minute ballad composed by Moreira, written for a girl he had met in Niterói. It is considered a modinha inspired by the traditional cana-verde, a type of traditional dance from the interior of southeastern and central-western Brazil. The repetitive nature of the track, in relation to the song's mini-refrain, contributed to its enormous success.

The album's title track was inspired by Gilberto's Bossa nova style, and by a story he had told the group about his daughter's response to being involved in a violent altercation. Gilberto's daughter's optimism in the face of pain and sadness helped define the primary theme of the album: to criticize the melancholic nature of contemporary Brazilian music at the time, and to bring a sense of joyfulness to listeners in the face of the authoritarian regime that was in power at the time of the album's release.

Reception

Upon release, Acabou Chorare did not experience the critical acclaim that it would later receive. However, extensive airplay of songs on Brazilian radio like "Preta Pretinha" led to the album becoming a commercial success, with the album quickly selling over 150,000 copies, a substantial number in Brazilian music sales at the time of the album's release.

The album's critical status was re-appraised starting in the early 1990s, with music scholars and producers alike hailing the record as a masterpiece, both due to the record's musical content, as well as the influence it continues to exert on contemporary Brazilian music.

Acabou Chorare includes some of Novos Baianos' most popular hits. The album's title track, for example, was broadcast on Brazilian radio for 30 consecutive weeks. "Preta, Pretinha" is the most requested song by Novos Baianos fans and it was voted by the Brazilian edition of Rolling Stone as the 20th greatest Brazilian song. "Brasil Pandeiro" and "Mistério do Planeta" are also popular tracks.

Legacy
The album has influenced many Brazilian musicians and bands. The absence of a hierarchy within the group inspired many bands, such as Orquestra Imperial and Tribalistas, to take a similar approach. The focus on samba rhythm was the basis for the music of Vanessa da Mata and Roberta Sá. João Gilberto, who was a major influence in the making of the album, was himself influenced by it and its creators.

Track listing

"Um Bilhete Pra Didi" is performed by backup band A Cor do Som.

Personnel
Novos Baianos
Moraes Moreira: vocals (in "Brasil Pandeiro", "Preta, Pretinha", "Acabou Chorare" and "Besta É Tu") and acoustic guitar
Baby Consuelo: vocals (in "Brasil Pandeiro", "Tinindo, Trincando" and "A Menina Dança"), cabasa, triangle and maracas
Paulinho Boca de Cantor: vocals (in "Brasil Pandeiro", "Swing de Campo Grande" and "Mistério do Planeta") and tambourine
Pepeu Gomes: electric guitar, acoustic guitar and craviola
Luiz Galvão: lyrics
A Cor do Som

 Jorginho Gomes: drums, bongos, cavaquinho
 José "Baixinho" Roberto : drums, bongos, percussion
 Dadi Carvalho: electric bass
 Luís Bolacha: bongos

References

1972 albums
Novos Baianos albums
Som Livre albums